Geologically, a high island or volcanic island is an island of volcanic origin. The term can be used to distinguish such islands from low islands, which are formed from sedimentation or the uplifting of coral reefs (which have often formed on sunken volcanos).

Definition and origin

The two types of islands are often found in proximity to each other, especially among the islands of the South Pacific Ocean, where low islands are found on the fringing reefs that surround most high islands. Volcanic islands normally arise above a hotspot.

Habitability
High islands above a certain size usually have fresh groundwater, while low islands often do not, so high islands are more likely to be habitable.

See also

References

External links 
 Micronesian culture: High island and low island cultures at Britannica.com. Retrieved 2011-09-22.

Islands by type